A.S.D. Porfido Albiano is an Italian association football club located in Albiano, Trentino-Alto Adige/Südtirol. It currently plays in Serie D. Its colors are red and black.

References

External links
 Official site

Football clubs in Italy
Football clubs in Trentino
Association football clubs established in 1968
1968 establishments in Italy